Antton is a Basque and Finnish given name and nickname used in the Basque Country, Finland, Republic of Karelia, Estonia and Sweden. Notable people with this name include the following:

Given name
Antton Luengo (born 1981), Basque cyclist

Nickname
Antton, nickname of Antony Lant or Anthony Lant, English drummer

See also

Anthon (given name)
Anton (given name)
Antoon
Antto (disambiguation)
Antxon, name
Anttoni Honka

References

Basque masculine given names
Finnish masculine given names